Silent Cry is a British television crime thriller film, first broadcast on Channel 5 in 2003, that follows the story of a young girl named Rachel (Emily Woof), who is told that her new-born baby has died shortly after birth. Rachel, however, later begins to suspect that the baby may have in fact been abducted and sets about discovering the truth. The film was directed by Julian Richards and stars Woof, Douglas Henshall, Frank Finlay, Clive Russell, Kevin Whately and Craig Kelly. It was released on Region 1 DVD in the United States on 20 August 2013.

Internationally, the film was broadcast in Germany by ZDF under the title Albtraum ohne Ende, and in Eastern Europe and Latin America by HBO. The film was also released on DVD in Australia, Germany and Sweden; with the German adaptation re-titled Schrei in der Dunkelheit and the Swedish adaptation re-titled Allt Har Ett Pris. The film won the Gold Remi Award at the WorldFest-Houston International Film Festival in 2004, and Woof was also awarded the accolade of Best Actress at both the Love is Folly film festival in Bulgaria and the Bruxelles film festival in Belgium.

Synopsis
Rachel Stewart (Emily Woof) is devastated to learn her newborn has died shortly after birth, but a short while later, she begins to suspect the baby has been abducted. Certain that there's only one way to find out the truth, Rachel returns to the hospital. Here she encounters the menacing Dennis Betts (Clive Russell), and in an attempt to flee from him, she ís forced to hide in a car belonging to Daniel Stone (Douglas Henshall), a hospital porter. Initially reluctant to help, Daniel's conscience eventually gets the better of him. Rachel's world is further rocked by the death of her best friend Annie (Stephanie Buttle), and the discovery that Dennis Betts is actually a policeman, with his own very personal reasons for pursuing Rachel. As Rachel and Daniel race through London's nightscape, desperate to stay one step ahead of Betts, every discovery unleashes further hell, extending way beyond the disappearance of Rachel's baby. Their only solid lead seems to be Joanne (Sarah Cattle), a young prostitute, whose own baby provides a link. But with Betts systematically eliminating anyone in his way, a further web of conspiracy unfolds and Rachel and Daniel are led to her old family doctor, Robert Barrum (Frank Finlay).

Cast
 Emily Woof — Rachel Stewart
 Douglas Henshall — Daniel Stone
 Clive Russell — DS Dennis Betts
 Kevin Whately — Dr. Richard Herd
 Frank Finlay — Dr. Robert Barrum
 Craig Kelly — DC Robert Mosley
 Stephanie Buttle — Annie Cox
 Steve Sweeney — Jimmy Tibbs
 Roger Nott — Pat Towne
 Richard Lumsden — Tim Cox
 Tilly Vosburgh — Sarah Betts
 Sarah Cattle — Joanne Dreyer
 Tameka Empson — Hairdresser

References

External links 

2002 films
2000s English-language films
2002 thriller films
British independent films
British thriller films
2002 independent films
2000s British films